Interlock can refer to the following:

Ignition interlock device
Interlock (band) an industrial/alternative metal band
Interlock (engineering)
Interlocking (railway signaling)
Interlock (cinema projection)
Interlocking tower
an interlocked hutch in a synchrotron radiation beamline protects user from being accidentally exposed to radiation when a beamline is active
Interlock Protocol, a cryptographic protocol designed to thwart eavesdropping when using an anonymous key exchange protocol, such as Diffie-Hellman
Interlock role-playing system
Interlocking spur: landsliding occurring in a river's upper course which modifies the river bed pattern
Mechanically-interlocked molecular architectures in Supramolecular chemistry comprises a.o., Catenane and Rotaxane molecules, and Molecular knot
Interlock fabric, a double-knitted jersey fabric.
Interlocking directorate (business)
Hocket and kotekan (musical techniques)